Idiotville is a ghost town in Tillamook County, Oregon, United States, near the mouth of Idiot Creek on the Wilson River, on the route of Oregon Route 6. Idiotville's elevation is 1,200 feet (400 m).

Background
Nothing remains at the site.

The nearby stream was named Idiot Creek after the community and was added to the official United States Board on Geographic Names list in 1977. About a half mile (800 m) up Idiot Creek was a logging camp called Ryan's Camp, which was part of the salvage operations following the Tillamook Burn. Since the spot was so remote, it was said that only an idiot would work there, so the camp was popularly known as Idiotville. The name was eventually applied to the stream. Idiotville has been noted for its unusual name.

See also
List of ghost towns in Oregon

References

Former populated places in Tillamook County, Oregon
Ghost towns in Oregon
Logging communities in the United States
Tillamook Burn